Giovanni Hiwat (born 11 November 1993) is a Dutch footballer who plays as a winger for SDC Putten. He formerly played for PEC Zwolle and Sparta Rotterdam.

Career
On 10 January 2019, Hiwat signed with Swedish club Syrianska FC.

In July 2020, it was announced that Hiwat would join Derde Divisie club SteDoCo.

Honours
PEC Zwolle
Eerste Divisie: 2011–12
KNVB Cup: 2013–14

Sparta Rotterdam
Eerste Divisie: 2015-16

References

External links
 Voetbal International profile 
 
 

1993 births
Living people
Dutch footballers
Dutch expatriate footballers
PEC Zwolle players
SC Cambuur players
Sparta Rotterdam players
Helmond Sport players
Syrianska FC players
SteDoCo players
Superettan players
Eredivisie players
Eerste Divisie players
Derde Divisie players
Sportspeople from Zwolle
Association football wingers
Dutch expatriate sportspeople in Sweden
Expatriate footballers in Sweden
Footballers from Overijssel
SDC Putten players